The Pfunderer Bach is a stream in South Tyrol, Italy. It flows into the Rienz in Niedervintl.

References 
 Information about the Pfunderer Bach in German and Italian.

External links 

Rivers of Italy
Rivers of South Tyrol